Agatha also Agata, is a feminine given name derived from the Greek feminine name  (Agáthē; alternative form:  Agathḗ), which is a nominalized form of  (agathḗ), i.e. the feminine form of the adjective  (agathós) "good". 

It was the name of St. Agatha of Sicily, a third-century Christian martyr. Rarely has the name been given in English-speaking countries during recent years. Agatha was last ranked among the top 1,000 names for girls born in the United States during the 1930s.

“Agatha” is a common name in Greece and countries that speak Germanic languages.

Russian name
In Russian, the name "" (Agata) was borrowed from the Western European languages, and derives from the same Ancient Greek root from which older names Agafya and Agafa also come. Its masculine version is Agat. In 1924–1930, the name was included into various Soviet calendars, which included the new and often purposefully created names promoting the new Soviet realities and encouraging the break with the tradition of using the names in the Synodal Menologia.

Its diminutives include Agatka, Aga, and Gata.

People

Agatha
Agatha of Sicily (died 251), Christian saint sometime spelled as Saint Agata
Agatha, wife of Samuel of Bulgaria (born 10th century), Bulgarian Empress
Agatha, wife of Edward the Exile (before 1030 – after 1070), Anglo-Saxon royalty
Agatha of Lorraine (c.1120–1147), wife of Renaud III, Count of Burgundy
Agatha Christine of Hanau-Lichtenberg (1632–1681), daughter of Count Philip Wolfgang of France
Agatha Marie of Hanau (1599–1636), German countess
Agatha Amata (born 1969), Nigeria television personality
Agatha Bacovia (1895–1981), Romanian poet
Agatha Barbara (1923–2002), only female President of Malta
Agatha Bârsescu (1857–1939), Romanian actress, opera singer, and teacher
Ágatha Bednarczuk (born 1983), Brazilian beach volleyball player
Agatha Bennett (1919–2006), American artist
Agatha Biddle (1797–1873), French fur trader
Agatha Chapman (1907–1963), British-Canadian economist
Agatha Christie (1890–1976), English crime writer
Agatha Deken (1741–1804), Dutch writer
Agatha Dietschi (fl. 1547), German cross dresser
Agatha Egbudike (born 1985), Nigerian weightlifter
Agatha Gothe-Snape (born 1980), Australian artist
Agatha Harrison (1885–1954), English industrial welfare reformer
Agatha Jassem, Canadian microbiologist
Agatha Kong (born 1988), Hong Kong singer
Agatha Lin (1817–1858), Chinese saint and martyr
Agatha Maksimova (born 1993), Russian-French actress, model, and beauty pageant titleholder
Agatha Moreira (born 1992), Brazilian actress and model
Agatha van der Mijn (1700–c.1780), Dutch flower painter
Agatha Lovisa de la Myle (died 1787), Baltic-German and Latvian poet
Ágatha Ruiz de la Prada (born 1960), Spanish noble and fashion designer
Agatha Sangma (born 1980), member of the Parliament of India
Agatha Streicher (1520 – 1581), German physician
Agatha Welhouk (1637–1715), Dutch woman setting a legal precedent with regard to marriage
Agatha Wong (born 1998), Filipino wushu athlete
Agatha Yi Kyong-i (1814–1840), Korean saint and martyr
Agatha Zethraeus (1872–1966), Dutch artist

Agathe
Agathe Aladin (born 1967), Haitian artist
Agathe Backer Grøndahl (1847–1907), Norwegian pianist and composer
Agathe L. van Beverwijk (1907–1963), Dutch mycologist and botanist
Agathe Bonitzer (born 1989), French actress
Agathe Fontain (born 1951), Greenlandic politician
Agathe Alexandrine Gavaudan (1801–1877), French operatic contralto
Agathe Génois (born 1952), Canadian writer
Agathe Habyarimana (born 1942), the widow of former Rwandan President
Agathe de La Boulaye (born 1972), French actress
Agathe de La Fontaine (born 1972), French actress
Agathe Laisné (born 1999), French golfer
Agathe Lasch (1879–1942), German philologist
Agathe Lecaron (born 1974), French radio and television presenter
Agathe Max, French violinist
Agathe Meunier (born 1993), French acrobatic gymnast
Agathe N'Nindjem-Yolemp (born 1980), Cameroonian basketball player
Agathe Ngani (born 1992), Cameroonian footballer
Agathe Ngo Nack (born 1958), Cameroonian athlete
Agathe Pembellot (1942–2016), Congolese judge
Agathe Poschmann (born 1922), German actress
Agathe de Rambaud (1764–1853), French royal nanny
Agathe Rousselle (born 1988), French journalist, model, and actress
Agathe de Saint-Père (1657–1748), French-Canadian business entrepreneur and inventor
Agathe de Saint Etienne de La Tour (1690–1765), Canadian landowner
Agathe-Sophie Sasserno (1810–1860), French poet
Agathe Sauzon (born 1992), French golfer
Agathe Snow (born 1976), New York based artist
Agathe Sochat (born 1995), French rugby union player
Agathe Sorel (born 1935), London artist
Agathe Thornton (1910–2006), New Zealand academic
Agathe von Trapp (1913–2010), eldest daughter of the Trapp Family Singers
Agathe Turgis (1892–?), French fencer
Agathe Uwilingiyimana (1953–1994), Rwandan Prime Minister 1993–1994
Agathe Whitehead (1891–1922), British-Austrian heiress and aritocrat

Agata
Agata Balsamo (born 1970), Italian long-distance runner
Agata Barańska (born 1993), Polish tennis player
Agata Biernat (born 1989), Polish beauty pageant titleholder
Agata Błażowska (born 1978), Polish ice dancer
Agata Bulwa (born 1975), Polish archer
Agata Buzek (born 1976), Polish actress
Agata Ciabattoni, Italian mathematician
Ágata Cruz, pseudonym of Luz Machado (1916–1999), Venezuelan political activist, journalist, and poet
Agata Czaplicki (born 1983), Swiss swimmer
Agata della Pietà (fl. c. 1800), Italian composer, singer, and teacher of music
Agata Flori (born 1938), Italian film actress
Agata Forkasiewicz (born 1994), Polish sprinter
Agata Gotova (born 1971), Russian child actress
Agata Grzybowska (born 1984), Polish photojournalist
Agata Guściora (born 1994), Polish footballer
Agata Hikari (1943–1992), Japanese novelist and translator
Agata Karczmarek (1963–2016), Polish long jumper
Agata Karczmarzewska-Pura (born 1978), Polish volleyball player
Agata Korc (born 1986), Polish swimmer
Agata Kornhauser-Duda (born 1972), wife of Andrzej Duda, president of Poland
Agata Kryger (born 1997), Polish figure skater
Agata Kulesza (born 1971), Polish actress
Agata Materowicz (born 1963), Polish artist
Agata Mróz-Olszewska (1982–2008), Polish volleyball player
Agata Muceniece (born 1989), Latvian actress, model, and television presenter
Agata Ozdoba (born 1988), Polish judoka
Agata Parahina (born 1999), Russian draughts player
Agata Passent (born 1973), Polish journalist and writer
Agata Perenc (born 1990), Polish judoka
Agata Pietrzyk (born 1988), Polish freestyle wrestler
Agata Piszcz, Polish sprint canoeist
Agata Pyzik (born 1983), Polish journalist and cultural critic
Agata Rosłońska (born 1983), Polish ice dancer
Agata Różańska (born 1968), Polish astronomer and astrophysicist
Agata Sawicka (born 1985), Polish volleyball player
Agata Smogorzewska, Polish scientist
Agata Smoktunowicz (born 1973), Polish mathematician
Agata Strausa (born 1989), Latvian long-distance runner
Agata Suszka (born 1971), Polish biathlete
Agata Szymczewska (born 1985), Polish violinist
Agata Tarczyńska (born 1988), Polish footballer
Agata Trzebuchowska (born 1992), Polish actress
Agata Tuszyńska (born 1957), Polish writer, poet and journalist
Agata Vostruchovaitė (born 2000), Lithuanian artistic gymnast
Agata Witkowska (born 1989), Polish volleyball player
Agata Wojtyszek (born 1967), Polish politician
Agata Wróbel (born 1981), Polish weightlifter
Agata Wybieralska (born 1978), Polish-Italian field hockey player
Agata Zubel (born 1978), Polish composer and singer
Agata Zupin (born 1998), Slovenian hurdler

Fictional characters
Agatha de Lacey, a minor character in Mary Shelley's Frankenstein
Agatha Clay/Heterodyne, the heroine of the Girl Genius comic book series
Agatha Magtibay, one of the main protagonists that is evil in The Blood Sisters (TV series)
Agatha Crumm, the title character of a newspaper comic strip
Agatha Flugelschmidt, a character in the live action/animated television series Noddy played by Jayne Eastwood
Agatha Gregson or Aunt Agatha, recurring character in the Jeeves stories of British writer P. G. Wodehouse
Agatha Hannigan, disturbed caregiver and central antagonist of Annie (musical)
Agatha Harkness, Marvel Comics witch
Agatha "Aggie" Prenderghast, the main antagonist of ParaNorman
Agatha Raisin, amateur detective in a series of novels by M.C. Beaton
Agatha Troy, Ngaio Marsh character, wife of Roderick Alleyn
Agatha Trunchbull, the sadistic antagonist of Roald Dahl's book Matilda
Agatha (Pokémon), a fictional character in the Pokémon franchise
Agatha, from the 2014 American comedy The Grand Budapest Hotel
 Aunt Agatha, one of the main characters in the PBS Kids series Noddy.
Agatha of Woods Beyond, one of the main characters in the book series The School for Good and Evil'

Regional variants
Agaate (Estonian) 
Agafia (Ukrainian)
Agat(h)e (Danish, French, Greek, Norwegian)
Agata or Ágata (Galician, Portuguese, Italian, Polish, Slovene, Spanish, Swedish, foreign adaptation for Ukrainian)
Agáta (Czech, Slovak)
Ágota/Agota (Hungarian, Lithuanian)
Agate (Latvian)
Águeda (Galician, Portuguese, Spanish)
Àgueda or Àgata (Catalan)
Ukanesh, Ukiana (Chuvash)
Ågot (Norwegian) 
Agafya (Russian)

Diminutive variants
Aagje or Aagtje (Dutch)
Agacia (Polish)
Agusia (Polish)
Agatina (Italian)
Agatka (Polish)
Aggie (English)
Ági (Hungarian)
Agunia (Polish)
Aguś (Polish)
Agotėlė (Lithuanian)
Agasha (Russian)
Ague (Spanish)
Aet (Estonian)

See alsoAgathe Cléry, 2008 French movie

References
Notes

Sources
В. А. Никонов (V. A. Nikonov). "Ищем имя" (Looking for a Name). Изд. "Советская Россия". Москва, 1988. 
Н. А. Петровский (N. A. Petrovsky). "Словарь русских личных имён" (Dictionary of Russian First Names). ООО Издательство "АСТ". Москва, 2005. 
[1] А. В. Суперанская (A. V. Superanskaya). "Современный словарь личных имён: Сравнение. Происхождение. Написание" (Modern Dictionary of First Names: Comparison. Origins. Spelling). Айрис-пресс. Москва, 2005. 
[2] А. В. Суперанская (A. V. Superanskaya). "Словарь русских имён" (Dictionary of Russian Names''). Издательство Эксмо. Москва, 2005. 

Given names of Greek language origin
Dutch feminine given names
English feminine given names
Russian feminine given names
Slovene feminine given names
Swedish feminine given names
Feminine given names

pl:Agata